Padang Rengas is a federal constituency in Perak, Malaysia, that has been represented in the Dewan Rakyat since 1974.

The federal constituency was created in the 1974 redistribution and is mandated to return a single member to the Dewan Rakyat under the first past the post voting system.

Demographics

History
It was abolished in 1986 when it was redistributed. It was re-created in 2003. Agriculture is the main economical activities in the area. Padang Rengas is surrounded by the small rubber estates creating job opportunity to the residents. Residents have a mix of Malays, Chinese, Indian and foreign workers. Liman Kati is the village with shops for business activities to help the rubber estate workers for daily supply and needs. Padang Rengas is well connected to the Royal Town Kuala Kangsar and capital of state Ipoh.

Polling districts
According to the federal gazette issued on 31 October 2022, the Padang Rengas constituency is divided into 31 polling districts.

Representation history

State constituency

Current state assembly members

Local governments

Election results

References

Perak federal constituencies